Coronatus is a German gothic metal band, formed in Ludwigsburg in 1999.

Fronted by two female singers with contrasting voices and styles, the band has released ten studio albums since 2007. Recreatio Carminis and Secrets of Nature are the only albums so far to feature three female singers.

Band history 
Founded in 1999 by vocalist Georgios Grigoriadis and drummer Mats Kurth, Coronatus released its debut single Von Engeln nur in 2002. In 2004, Grigoriadis left, and was replaced by not one but two singers, Carmen R. Schäfer and Viola Schuch. The permanent line-up was expanded in 2006 with the addition of guitarist Stefan Häfele, bassist Wolle Nillies and keyboardist Fabian Merkt.

2007 saw the departure of Viola Schuch, who was replaced by Ada Flechtner.

Chriz diAnno (bass) has played with the band in 2003, 2005–2006, and then again since 2007. Ada Flechtner left the band to devote full attention to her studies, but joined the German symphonic metal band Voices of Destiny in 2013, after their lead vocalist Maike Holzmann departed. Mid 2010, Natalia Kempin joined the band on the vocals and Dirk Baur joined the band on bass guitar. On February 2, 2011, Natalia Kempin announced on her Facebook, that she left the band, due to different opinions about the band's music.

Musical style 
The band follows in a style influenced by established groups Nightwish and Epica. Their lyrics are in German, English and Latin, and their songs deal with life, interpersonal relationships, religion and death. Their musical style is melodic, rhythmic gothic metal with "a liking to the Middle Ages genre: piano, flute, bagpipes and violin manifest the balancing act between medieval atmosphere and heavy metal sound". Songs are performed by two female singers whose styles are very different.

Concerts and recordings 
The band's first contract was in June 2007 with record label Massacre Records and their first album was released on 21 September 2007. Their second album was launched on 28 November 2008. The band has also taken part in several concerts with groups such as Haggard and Within Temptation.

Members
Current Members
Leni Eitrich - vocals (2021–present)
Mats Kurth – drums (1999–present)
Jörn Langenfeld – guitar (2019–present)
Kristina Jülich – violin (2019–present)

Previous Members
Carmen R. Lorch – vocals (2004–2010, 2013–2019)
Mareike Makosch – vocals (2011–2014, 2017–2021)
Gaby Koss – vocals (2017–2018)
Pinu'u Remus – keyboard (2013–2014, 2015)
Georgios Grigoriadis – vocals (1999–2003)
Martin Goes – bass guitar (2002–2003)
Oliver Szczypula – guitars (2002–2003)
Tanja Ivenz – vocals (2002–2003)
Chriz DiAnno – bass guitar (2003, 2007–2009)
Clarissa Darling – guitars (2004–2005)
Verena Schock – vocals (2004–2006)
Wolle Nillies – guitars (2005–2007)
Jo Lang – guitars (2007–2011)
Fabian Merkt – keyboards (2005–2010)
Ada Flechtner – vocals (2007–2009, 2011–2014)
Viola Schuch – vocals (2006–2007)
Michael Teutsch – bass guitar (2006)
Stefan Häfele – bass guitar (2006–2007)
Jakob Thiersch – guitars (2006)
Todd Goldfinger – bass guitar (2009–2010)
Lisa Lasch – vocals (2009–2010)
Natalia Kempin – vocals (2010–2011)
Simon Hassemer – keyboards (2011–2012)
Aria Keramati Nori – guitar   (2009–2014)
Dirk Baur – bass     (2011–2014)
Anny Maleyes – vocals (2014–2017)
Olivér D. – guitar (2014–2017)
Susanne Bachmann – vocals (2015–2017), bass (2017)
Dennis Schwachhofer – keyboards (2015)
Katharina G. Mann - vocals (2019–2021)
Moni Francis - vocals (2021–2022)

Timeline

Discography
Studio albums
2007: Lux Noctis
2008: Porta Obscura
2009: Fabula Magna
2011: Terra Incognita
2013: Recreatio Carminis
2014: Cantus Lucidus
2015: Raben im Herz
2017: Secrets of Nature
2019: The Eminence of Nature
2021: Atmosphere

Demos
2002: Von Engeln nur
2005: Promo CD

Compilation albums
2011: Best of
2012: Best of 2007–2011

References

External links 

Musical groups established in 1999
German gothic metal musical groups
German symphonic metal musical groups
Musical quintets
Medieval metal musical groups
Massacre Records artists
1999 establishments in Germany